Thirumagan is a 2007 Indian Tamil-language drama film directed by Ratnakumar. The film stars S. J. Suryah, Meera Jasmine, Malavika, Lakshana and Preethi Varma. Vijayakumar, Radha Ravi, Ranjith, Saranya Ponvannan, and Manivannan play supporting roles. The music of the film was composed by Deva with editing by Anthony and cinematography by Venu. The film was shot completely in Tirunelveli and is a village story based on the relationships between a father and son. The film released on 9 March 2007 and received mixed reviews.

Plot

Thangapaandi (S.J. Suryah) is the son of Malaiswamy (Vijayakumar), who is financially mediocre but well respected and loved in the Tirunelveli village. Thangapaandi, however, is immature and spends his time gallivanting about the village and dancing at temple functions, while failing his +2 examinations with regularity every year.

His niece Rasathi (Preethi Varma) is in love with him, as their parents have informally promised them to each other from childhood itself. However, Thangapaandi pursues his own agenda and falls for loud-mouthed orphan girl Ayyakka (Meera Jasmine), who makes and sells pots for a living.

Thangapaandi, despite his lack of a regular job or prospects, appears to be the most sought after bachelor in the village. In the midst of this love 'square', the elders add their own two cents of interference, causing more chaos. How Thangapaandi and his ladies deal with this is the fodder for the rest of the film.

Cast

Production
Rathnakumar, who directed Senathipathi with Sathyaraj, has announced in 2005 that S. J. Suryah would act in his film titled "Thirumagan". There were rumours that Suryah and Meerajasmine are dating, which was eventually denied by Suryah.

During the shooting, Suryah had a misunderstanding with Rathnakumar, many of the crew claimed that they felt difficult to work with director.

Soundtrack
Lyrics were written by Vairamuthu.

References

External links
SJ with Rahman again
Thirumahan Official Website

2007 films
Films scored by Deva (composer)
2000s Tamil-language films